The 1982–83 season of the European Cup football club tournament was won for the first time by Hamburg, who beat Juventus 1–0 in the final at Athens' Olympic Stadium.

It was the first time since 1976 that the trophy did not go to a club from England. Aston Villa, the defending champions, were eliminated by Juventus in the quarter-finals. Liverpool, the other English side in the tournament, were defeated by Polish champions Widzew Lodz, also in the quarter-finals.

Bracket

Preliminary round

|}

First leg

Second leg

Dinamo București won 4–3 on aggregate

First round

|}

First leg

Second leg

Hamburg won 3–1 on aggregate

Olympiacos won 2–1 on aggregate

2–2 on aggregate; 17 Nëntori Tirana won on away goals

Dynamo Kyiv won 4–0 on aggregate

Sporting CP won 3–1 on aggregate

CSKA September Flag won 2–0 on aggregate

Celtic won 4–3 on aggregate

Real Sociedad won 4–2 on aggregate

Widzew Łódź won 7–2 on aggregate

Rapid Wien won 13–0 on aggregate

HJK Helsinki won 3–2 on aggregate

Liverpool won 5–1 on aggregate

Aston Villa won 3–1 on aggregate

Dinamo București won 3–2 on aggregate

Standard Liège won 5–3 on aggregate

Juventus won 7–4 on aggregate

Second round

|}

First leg

17 Nëntori Tirana withdrew, Dynamo Kyiv awarded the victory.

Second leg

Hamburg won 5–0 on aggregate

2–2 on aggregate; Sporting CP won on away goals.

Real Sociedad won 3–2 on aggregate

Widzew Łódź won 6–5 on aggregate

Liverpool won 5–1 on aggregate

Aston Villa won 6–2 on aggregate

Juventus won 3–1 on aggregate

Quarter-finals

|}

First leg

Second leg

Hamburg won 4–2 on aggregate

Real Sociedad won 2–1 on aggregate

Widzew Łódź won 4–3 on aggregate

Juventus won 5–2 on aggregate

Semi-finals

|}

First leg

Second leg

Hamburg won 3–2 on aggregate

Juventus won 4–2 on aggregate

Final

Top scorers
The top scorers from the 1982–83 European Cup (excluding preliminary round) are as follows:

Notes

References

External links
1982–83 All matches – season at UEFA website
 European Cup results at Rec.Sport.Soccer Statistics Foundation
 All scorers 1982–83 European Cup (excluding preliminary round) according to protocols UEFA 
1982/83 European Cup – results and line-ups (archive)

1982–83 in European football
European Champion Clubs' Cup seasons